The 1928 Missouri lieutenant gubernatorial election was held on November 6, 1928. Republican nominee Edward Henry Winter defeated Democratic nominee Frank Gaines Harris with 52.47% of the vote.

Primary elections
Primary elections were held on August 7, 1928.

Democratic primary

Candidates
Frank Gaines Harris, State Senator
N. W. Brickey
Samuel Rosenfeld
Charles Arthur Anderson, attorney
Clyde W. Wagner
John T. Baird
Otto W. Hammer

Results

General election

Candidates
Major party candidates
Edward Henry Winter, Republican
Frank Gaines Harris, Democratic

Other candidates
Frank J. Offenburger, Socialist
Karl Oberheu, Socialist Labor

Results

References

1928
Gubernatorial
Missouri